A transitional military cabinet was formed on 22 September 1988, the last day of Amine Gemayel presidency, dismissing the current cabinet headed by Salim Hoss. The Prime Minister was General Michel Aoun, the commander of the army at the time.

Composition

References 

Cabinets established in 1988
Cabinets disestablished in 1990
Cabinets of Lebanon
1988 establishments in Lebanon
1990 disestablishments in Lebanon
Michel Aoun